Priatek Plaza, also known as One Progress Plaza, is a 28-story skyscraper designed by Jung Brannen Associates located at 200 Central Avenue in downtown St. Petersburg, Florida. The tower was formerly known as the Bank of America Tower, and One Progress Plaza. 

On September 18, 2015, Kucera Properties announced that the tower would be renamed Priatek Plaza after the company Priatek. The official dedication ceremony for the new plaza's name was held on September 17, 2015. 

Other major tenants located in Priatek Plaza include The Mill Restaurant, Merrill Lynch, American Express Serve, Raymond James, and iQor.

See also 
 List of tallest buildings in St. Petersburg

References

External links 
 
 One Progress Plaza at Emporis

Skyscrapers in Florida
Jung Brannen buildings
Bank of America buildings
Buildings and structures in St. Petersburg, Florida
Skyscraper office buildings in Florida

Office buildings completed in 1990
1990 establishments in Florida